Mangelia jerbaensis is a species of sea snail, a marine gastropod mollusk in the family Mangeliidae, the cone snails and their allies.

Distribution
This species occurs in the Mediterranean Sea off Tunisia.

References

 Chirli C., 1997 - Malacofauna Pliocenica Toscana. Vol. 1. Superfamiglia Conoidea, p. 129 p., 29 pls
 Gofas, S.; Le Renard, J.; Bouchet, P. (2001). Mollusca, in: Costello, M.J. et al. (Ed.) (2001). European register of marine species: a check-list of the marine species in Europe and a bibliography of guides to their identification. Collection Patrimoines Naturels, 50: pp. 180–213
 Scarponi D. & Della Bella G. (2019). Molluschi Marini del Plio-Pleistocene dell'Emila-Romagna, vol. 3: Conidae II.

jerbaensis
Gastropods described in 1997